Stanley Skinner (October 8, 1893 – June 7, 1985) was an English-born American professional ice hockey player. He played with the Seattle Metropolitans of the Pacific Coast Hockey Association.

References

1893 births
1985 deaths
American men's ice hockey right wingers
Ice hockey players from Michigan
People from Houghton, Michigan
Seattle Metropolitans players
British emigrants to the United States